Lorenzo Vaiani, detto dello Sciorina (Florence,  29 Oct 1541 - Florence 2 June 1598 ) was a Florentine painter of the Mannerist style. A pupil of Bronzino, he was part of the newly born "Accademia del Disegno" in Florence. He was employed in Giorgio Vasari's team that decorated of the Studiolo of Francesco I in the Palazzo Vecchio.

References

Mannerist painters
16th-century Italian painters
Italian male painters
Painters from Florence